In Chinese philosophy, yi refers to righteousness, justice, morality, and meaning.

Confucianism 
In Confucianism, yi involves a moral disposition to do good, and also the intuition and sensibility to do so competently. Yi represents moral acumen which goes beyond simple rule following, involving a balanced understanding of a situation, and the "creative insight" and decision-generating ability necessary to apply virtues properly and appropriately in a situation with no loss of sight of the total good.

Yi resonates with Confucian philosophy's orientation towards the cultivation of benevolence (ren) and ritual propriety (li).

In application, yi is a "complex principle" which includes:
 skill in crafting actions which have moral fitness according to a given concrete situation;
 the wise recognition of such fitness;
 the intrinsic satisfaction that comes from that recognition

Daoism 
The Zhuangzi discusses the relationship between yi (righteousness) and de (virtue).

See also 
De (Chinese) 
Moral character

References

Bibliography 

 
 
 

Confucian ethics
Concepts in Chinese philosophy